The RMS Queen Mary is a retired British ocean liner that sailed primarily on the North Atlantic Ocean from 1936 to 1967 for the Cunard-White Star Line and was built by John Brown & Company in Clydebank, Scotland. The two ships were a British response to the express superliners built by German, Italian and French companies in the late 1920s and early 1930s.

With the outbreak of World War II, she was converted into a troopship and ferried Allied soldiers during the conflict.

Following the war, Queen Mary was refitted for passenger service and along with Queen Elizabeth commenced the two-ship transatlantic passenger service for which the two ships were initially built. The two ships dominated the transatlantic passenger transportation market until the dawn of the jet age in the late 1950s. By the mid-1960s, Queen Mary was ageing and was operating at a loss.

After several years of decreased profits for Cunard Line, Queen Mary was officially retired from service in 1967. She left Southampton for the last time on 31 October 1967 and sailed to the port of Long Beach, California, United States, where she was permanently moored. The City of Long Beach bought the ship to serve as a tourist attraction featuring restaurants, a museum and a hotel. The city contracted out management of the ship to various third-party firms over the years. It took back operational control in 2021 when the operator filed for bankruptcy and it was found that extensive repairs were needed to keep the ship from sinking.

Construction and naming

With Weimar Germany launching  and  into service, Britain did not want to be left behind in the shipbuilding race. White Star Line began construction on their 80,000-ton Oceanic in 1928, while Cunard planned a 75,000-ton unnamed ship of their own.

Construction on the ship, then known only as "Hull Number 534", began in December 1930 on the River Clyde by the John Brown & Company shipyard at Clydebank in Scotland. Work was halted in December 1931 due to the Great Depression and Cunard applied to the British Government for a loan to complete 534. The loan was granted, with enough money to complete the unfinished ship, and also to build a running mate, with the intention to provide a two ship weekly service to New York.

One condition of the loan was that Cunard merge with the White Star Line, another struggling British shipping company, which was Cunard's chief British rival at the time and which had already been forced by the depression to cancel construction of its Oceanic. Both lines agreed and the merger was completed on 10 May 1934. Work on Queen Mary resumed immediately and she was launched on 26 September 1934. Completion ultimately took  years and cost 3.5 million pounds sterling, then equal to $17.5 million . Much of the ship's interior was designed and constructed by the Bromsgrove Guild. Prior to the ship's launch, the River Clyde had to be specifically deepened to cope with her size, this being undertaken by the engineer D. Alan Stevenson.

The ship was named after Mary of Teck, consort of King George V. Until her launch, the name was kept a closely guarded secret. Legend has it that Cunard intended to name the ship Victoria, in keeping with company tradition of giving its ships names ending in "ia", but when company representatives asked the King's permission to name the ocean liner after Britain's "greatest Queen", he said his wife, Mary of Teck, would be delighted. And so, the legend goes, the delegation had, of course, no other choice but to report that No. 534 would be called Queen Mary.

This story was (and still is) denied by company officials, and traditionally the names of sovereigns have only been used for capital ships of the Royal Navy. This anecdote has been widely contested ever since Frank Braynard published it in his 1947 book, Lives of the Liners. Some support for the story was provided by Washington Post editor Felix Morley, who sailed as a guest of the Cunard Line on Queen Marys 1936 maiden voyage. In his 1979 autobiography, For the Record, Morley wrote that he was placed at a table with Sir Percy Bates, chairman of the Cunard Line. Bates told him the story of the naming of the ship "on condition you won't print it during my lifetime." The story was finally proven in 1988 when Braynard attended the same dinner party as Eleanor Sparkes, daughter of Sir Ashley Sparkes, who'd been with Bates during the conversation with George V. She confirmed the "favourite ship story" to him, telling the exact anecdote that Braynard had published in his book.

Despite this, Cunard still denies the name change. It is also possible the name Queen Mary was decided upon as a compromise between Cunard and the White Star Line, as both lines had traditions of using names either ending in "ic" with White Star and "ia" with Cunard.

The name had already been given to the Clyde turbine steamer , so Cunard made an arrangement with its owners and this older ship was renamed Queen Mary II.

Queen Mary was fitted with 24 Yarrow boilers in four boiler rooms and four Parsons turbines in two engine rooms. Queen Mary achieved 32.84 knots on her acceptance trials in early 1936.

On 24 March 1936, leaving Clydebank she ran aground on the River Clyde but with the help of tugboats she was refloated.

Pre-Second World War
In 1934 the new liner was launched by Her Majesty Queen Mary as RMS Queen Mary. On her way down the slipway, Queen Mary was slowed by eighteen drag chains, which checked the liner's progress into the River Clyde, a portion of which had been widened to accommodate the launch.

When she sailed on her maiden voyage from Southampton on 27 May 1936, she was commanded by Sir Edgar Britten, who had been the master designate for Cunard White Star whilst the ship was under construction at the John Brown shipyard. Queen Mary measured . Queen Mary sailed at high speed for most of her maiden voyage to New York, until heavy fog forced a reduction of speed on the final day of the crossing, arriving in New York Harbor on 1 June 1936.

Queen Mary design was criticised for being too traditional, especially when Normandie hull was revolutionary with a clipper-shaped, streamlined bow. Except for her cruiser stern, she seemed to be an enlarged version of her Cunard predecessors from the pre–First World War era. Her interior design, while mostly Art Deco, seemed restrained and conservative when compared to the ultramodern French liner. Nonetheless Queen Mary proved to be the more popular vessel than her rival, in terms of passengers carried.

In August 1936, Queen Mary captured the Blue Riband from Normandie, with average speeds of  westbound and  eastbound.

Interior
Among facilities available on board Queen Mary, the liner featured two indoor swimming pools, beauty salons, libraries and children's nurseries for all three classes, a music studio and lecture hall, telephone connectivity to anywhere in the world, outdoor paddle tennis courts and dog kennels. The largest room on board was the cabin class (first class) main dining room (grand salon), spanning three stories in height and anchored by wide columns. The ship had many air-conditioned public rooms on board. The cabin-class swimming pool facility spanned over two decks in height. This was the first ocean liner to be equipped with her own Jewish prayer roompart of a policy to show that British shipping lines avoided the antisemitism evident in Nazi Germany.

The cabin-class main dining room featured a large map of the transatlantic crossing, with twin tracks symbolising the winter/spring route (further south to avoid icebergs) and the summer/autumn route. During each crossing, a motorised model of Queen Mary would indicate the vessel's progress en route.

As an alternative to the main dining room, Queen Mary featured a separate cabin-class Verandah Grill on the Sun Deck at the upper aft of the ship. The Verandah Grill was an exclusive à la carte restaurant with a capacity of approximately eighty passengers and was converted to the Starlight Club at night. Also on board was the Observation Bar, an Art Deco-styled lounge with wide ocean views.

Woods from different regions of the British Empire were used in her public rooms and staterooms. Accommodation ranged from fully equipped, luxurious cabin (first) class staterooms to modest and cramped third-class cabins. Artists commissioned by Cunard in 1933 for works of art in the interior include Edward Wadsworth and A. Duncan Carse.

Second World War

In late August 1939, Queen Mary was on a return run from New York to Southampton. The international situation led to her being escorted by the battlecruiser . She arrived safely and set out again for New York on 1 September. By the time she arrived, war had been declared and she was ordered to remain in port alongside Normandie until further notice.

In March 1940, Queen Mary and Normandie were joined in New York by Queen Mary new running mate , fresh from her secret voyage from Clydebank. The three largest liners in the world sat idle for some time until the Allied commanders decided that all three ships could be used as troopships. Normandie was destroyed by fire during her troopship conversion. Queen Mary left New York for Sydney, Australia, where she, along with several other liners, was converted into a troopship to carry Australian and New Zealand soldiers to the United Kingdom.

In the Second World War conversion, the ship's hull, superstructure, and funnels were painted navy grey. As a result of her new colour, and in combination with her great speed, she became known as the "Grey Ghost". To protect against magnetic mines, a degaussing coil was fitted around the outside of the hull. Inside, stateroom furniture and decoration were removed and replaced with triple-tiered (fixed) wooden bunks, which were later replaced by "standee" (fold-up) bunks.

The woodwork in the staterooms, the cabin-class dining room, and other public areas were covered with leather. Queen Mary and Queen Elizabeth were the largest and fastest troopships involved in the war, often carrying as many as 15,000 men in a single voyage, and often travelling out of convoy and without escort. Their high speed and zigzag courses made it virtually impossible for U-boats to catch them.

Queen Mary was carrying thousands of Americans of the 29th Infantry Division to join the Allied forces in Europe. Due to the risk of U-boat attacks, Queen Mary was under orders not to stop under any circumstances and steamed onward with a fractured stem. This claim is contradicted by the liner's then Staff Captain (and later Cunard Commodore) Harry Grattidge, who records that Queen Mary Captain, Gordon Illingsworth, immediately ordered the accompanying destroyers to look for survivors within moments of Curacoa sinking.

From 8–14 December 1942, Queen Mary carried 10,389 soldiers and 950 crew (total 11,339). An account of this crossing can be found in Carter's book. As quoted in the book, Carter's father, Dr. Norval Carter, part of the 110th Station Hospital on board at the time, wrote in a letter that at one point Queen Mary "damned near capsized... One moment the top deck was at its usual height and then, swoom! Down, over, and forward she would pitch." It was calculated later that the ship rolled 52 degrees, and would have capsized had she rolled another three degrees.

From 25–30 July 1943, Queen Mary carried 15,740 soldiers and 943 crew (total 16,683), a standing record for the most passengers ever transported on one vessel. This was only possible in summer as passengers had to sleep on deck.

During the war Queen Mary carried British Prime Minister Winston Churchill across the Atlantic for meetings with fellow Allied forces officials on several occasions. He was listed on the passenger manifests as "Colonel Warden". Churchill would later remark that the Queen Mary had "shortened the war by a year."

Post-Second World War

After delivering war brides to Canada, Queen Mary made her fastest ever crossing, returning to Southampton in only three days, 22 hours and 42 minutes at an average speed of just under . From September 1946 to July 1947, Queen Mary was refitted for passenger service, adding air conditioning and upgrading her berth configuration to 711 first class (formerly called cabin class), 707 cabin class (formerly tourist class) and 577 tourist class (formerly third class) passengers. Following their refit, Queen Mary and Queen Elizabeth dominated the transatlantic passenger trade as Cunard White Star's two-ship weekly express service through the latter half of the 1940s and well into the 1950s. They proved highly profitable for Cunard (as the company was renamed in 1947).

On 1 January 1949, Queen Mary ran aground off Cherbourg, France. She was refloated the next day and returned to service.

In 1952, Queen Mary lost the Blue Riband she held for 14 years to the SS United States during her maiden voyage.

In 1958, the first commercial transatlantic flights by jet began a completely new era of competition for the Cunard Queens. With a London–New York travel time of just 7–8 hours now possible with the new aircraft, demand for a sea crossing of the ocean fell away markedly. On some voyages, winters especially, Queen Mary sailed into harbour with more crew than passengers, though both she and Queen Elizabeth still averaged over 1,000 passengers per crossing into the middle 1960s. By 1965, the entire Cunard fleet was operating at a loss.

Hoping to continue financing Queen Elizabeth 2 which was under construction at Brown's shipyard, Cunard mortgaged the majority of the fleet. Due to a combination of age, lack of public interest, inefficiency in a new market and the damaging after-effects of the national seamen's strike, Cunard announced that both Queen Mary and Queen Elizabeth would be retired from service and sold off. Many offers were submitted, and the bid of $3.45m/£1.2m from Long Beach, California surpassed the Japanese scrap merchants. Queen Mary was featured in the film Assault on a Queen (1966) starring Frank Sinatra.

Queen Mary was retired from service in 1967. Under the command of Captain John Treasure Jones, who had been her captain since 1965, she sailed from Southampton for the last time on 31 October with 1,093 passengers and 806 crew. After a voyage around Cape Horn, she arrived in Long Beach on 9 December. 
Queen Elizabeth was withdrawn in 1968 and Queen Elizabeth 2 took over the transatlantic route in 1969.

Long Beach

Queen Mary is permanently moored as a tourist attraction, hotel, museum and event facility in Long Beach.

Conversion

Queen Mary, bought by Long Beach in 1967, was converted from a seafaring vessel to floating hotel. The plan included clearing almost every area of the ship below "C" deck (called "R" deck after 1950, to lessen passenger confusion, as the restaurants were located on "R" deck) to make way for Jacques Cousteau's new Living Sea Museum.

It required the removal of all the boiler rooms, the forward engine room, both turbo generator rooms, the ship stabilisers and the water softening plant. The ship's empty fuel tanks were filled with local mud to keep the ship's centre of gravity and draft at the correct levels, as these critical factors had been affected by the removal of the various components and structure. Only the aft engine room and "shaft alley", at the stern of the ship, would be spared. The remaining space would be used for storage or office space.

One problem that arose during the conversion was a dispute between land-based and maritime unions over conversion jobs. The United States Coast Guard had the final say. Queen Mary was deemed a building, since most of her propellers had been removed and her machinery gutted. The ship was also repainted with its red water level paint at a slightly higher level than previous. During the conversion, the funnels were removed, as this area was needed to lift out the scrap materials from the engine and boiler rooms. Workers found that the funnels were significantly degraded and they were replaced with replicas.

With all of the lower decks nearly gutted from R deck and down, Diners Club, the initial lessee of the ship, converted the remainder of the vessel into a hotel. Diners Club Queen Mary dissolved and vacated the ship in 1970 after their parent company, Diners Club International, was sold, and a change in corporate direction was mandated during the conversion process. Specialty Restaurants, a Los Angeles-based company that focused on theme-based restaurants, took over as master lessee the following year.

This second plan was based on converting most of her first- and second-class cabins on A and B decks into hotel rooms, and converting the main lounges and dining rooms into banquet spaces. On Promenade Deck, the starboard promenade was enclosed to feature an upscale restaurant and café named Lord Nelson's and Lady Hamilton's; it was themed in the fashion of early-19th century sailing ships. The famed and elegant Observation Bar was redecorated as a western-themed bar.

The smaller first-class public rooms, such as the Drawing Room, Library, Lecture Room and the Music Studio, would be stripped of most of their fittings and converted to commercial use. This markedly expanded retail space on the ship. Two more shopping malls were built on the Sun Deck in separate spaces previously used for first-class cabins and engineers' quarters.

A post-war feature of the ship, the first-class cinema, was removed for kitchen space for the new Promenade Deck dining venues. The first-class lounge and smoking room were reconfigured and converted into banquet space. The second-class smoking room was subdivided into a wedding chapel and office space. On the Sun Deck, the elegant Verandah Grill would be gutted and converted into a fast-food eatery, while a new upscale dining venue was created directly above it on Sports Deck, in space once used for crew quarters.

The second-class lounges were expanded to the sides of the ship and used for banqueting. On R deck, the first-class dining room was reconfigured and subdivided into two banquet venues, the Royal Salon and the Windsor Room. The second-class dining room was subdivided into kitchen storage and a crew mess hall, while the third-class dining room was initially used as storage and crew space.

Also on R deck, the first-class Turkish bath complex, the 1930s equivalent to a spa, was removed. The second-class pool was removed and its space initially used for office space, while the first-class swimming pool was open for viewing by hotel guests and visitors. Because of modern safety codes and the compromised structural soundness of the area directly below, the swimming pool could not be used for swimming after the conversion, although it was filled with water until the late 1980s. Today the pool can only be seen on guided tours and is in a derelict condition, having never been maintained by the hotel operators. No second-class, third-class or crew cabins remain intact aboard the ship today.

Opening as a tourist destination

On 8 May 1971, Queen Mary opened her doors to tourists. Initially, only portions of the ship were open to the public as Specialty Restaurants had yet to open its dining venues and PSA had not completed work converting the ship's original First Class staterooms into the hotel. As a result, the ship was open only on weekends. On 11 December 1971, Jacques Cousteau's Museum of the Sea opened, with a quarter of the planned exhibits completed. Within the decade, Cousteau's museum closed due to low ticket sales and the deaths of many of the fish that were housed in the museum. On 2 November 1972, the PSA Hotel Queen Mary opened its initial 150 guest rooms. Two years later, with all 400 rooms finished, PSA brought in Hyatt Hotels to manage the hotel, which operated from 1974 to 1980 as the Queen Mary Hyatt Hotel.

By 1980, it had become apparent that the existing system was not working. The ship was losing millions each year for the city because the hotel, restaurants and museum were run by three separate concessionaires, while the city owned the vessel and operated guided tours. It was decided that a single operator with more experience in attractions was needed.

Jack Wrather, a local millionaire, had fallen in love with the ship because he and his wife, Bonita Granville, had fond memories of sailing on it numerous times. Wrather signed a 66-year lease with the city of Long Beach to operate the entire property. He oversaw the display of the H-4 Hercules, nicknamed the Spruce Goose, on long-term loan. The immense plane, which had been sitting in a hangar in Long Beach for decades unseen by the public, was installed in a huge geodesic dome adjacent to the liner in 1983, attracting increased attendance.

Wrather Port Properties operated the entire attraction after his death in 1984 until 1988, when his holdings were bought by the Walt Disney Company. Wrather had built the Disneyland Hotel in 1955, when Walt Disney had insufficient funds to construct the hotel himself. Disney had been trying to buy the hotel for 30 years. When they finally succeeded, they also acquired Queen Mary. This was never marketed as a Disney property.

Through the late 1980s and early 1990s, Queen Mary struggled financially. Disney pinned their hopes for turning the attraction around on Port Disney, a huge planned resort on the adjacent docks. It was to include an attraction known as DisneySea, a theme park celebrating the world's oceans. The plans eventually fell through; in 1992 Disney gave up the lease on the ship to focus on building what would become Disney California Adventure Park. The DisneySea concept was recycled a decade later in Japan as Tokyo DisneySea, with a recreated ocean liner resembling Queen Mary named the SS Columbia as the centrepiece of the American Waterfront area.

1992 closure and reopening
With Disney gone, the Hotel Queen Mary closed on 30 September 1992. The owners of the Spruce Goose, the Aero Club of Southern California, sold the plane to the Evergreen Aviation & Space Museum in Oregon. The plane departed on barges on 2 October 1992. The Queen Mary remained open until 31 December 1992 when it closed.

During this period, the ship was nominated and listed on the National Register of Historic Places in 1993. Also the Port of Long Beach turned over control over the vessel to the city in 1993.

On 5 February 1993, RMS Foundation, Inc signed a five-year lease with the city of Long Beach to act as the operators of the property. The foundation was run by President and C.E.O. Joseph F. Prevratil, who had managed the attraction for Wrather. On 26 February 1993 the tourist attraction reopened completely, while the hotel reopened partially on 5 March with 125 rooms and the banquet facilities, with the remainder of the rooms coming online on 30 April. In 1995, RMS Foundation's lease was extended to twenty years, while the scope of the lease was reduced to operation of the ship. A new company, Queen's Seaport Development, Inc. (QSDI), was established in 1995 to control the real estate adjacent to the vessel. The dome was used extensively as a soundstage for film and television by taking advantage of the adaptable interior space that was larger than any sound stage in the Los Angeles area. In 1998, the city of Long Beach extended the QSDI lease to 66 years. Carnival Cruises repurposed a portion of the dome as a passenger terminal in 2001. The California State Lands Commission also issued a report in response to citizens concerns about the use of public trust lands and mismanagement of public trust funds. The report determined that the uses were not barred by the granting statutes or the public trust doctrine, but may be considered necessarily incidental to the enjoyment of public tidelands. They found no evidence of mismanagement, a conclusion that was reviewed and affirmed by the State Attorney General.

In 2004, Queen Mary and Stargazer Productions added Tibbies Great American Cabaret to the space previously occupied by the ship's bank and wireless telegraph room. Stargazer Productions and Queen Mary transformed the space into a working dinner theatre complete with stage, lights, sound and scullery.

In 2005, QSDI sought Chapter 11 protection due to a rent credit dispute with the city. In 2006, the bankruptcy court requested bids from parties interested in taking over the lease from QSDI. The minimum required opening bid was $41M. The operation of the ship, by RMS Foundation, remained independent of the bankruptcy. In summer 2007, Queen Mary lease was sold to a group named "Save the Queen", managed by Hostmark Hospitality Group.

They planned to develop the land adjacent to Queen Mary, and upgrade, renovate and restore the ship. During their management, staterooms were updated with iPod docking stations and flatscreen TVs and the ship's three funnels and waterline area were repainted their original Cunard red colour. The portside Promenade Deck's planking was restored and refinished. Many lifeboats were repaired and patched, and the ship's kitchens were renovated with new equipment.

In late September 2009, management of Queen Mary was taken over by Delaware North Companies, who planned to continue the restoration and renovation of the ship and its property. They were determined to revitalise and enhance the ship as an attraction. But in April 2011, the city of Long Beach was informed that Delaware North was no longer managing Queen Mary. Garrison Investment Group said this decision was purely business. Delaware North continued to manage Scorpion, a Soviet submarine that has been a separate attraction next to Queen Mary since 1998.
Evolution Hospitality, LLC. assumed operational control of Queen Mary on 23 September 2011, with Garrison Investments leasing Queen Mary. The dome was used as a venue for the Long Beach Derby Gals roller derby team and as an event venue.

2006 meeting of the two Queen Marys

On 23 February 2006,  saluted her predecessor as she made a port of call in Los Angeles Harbor, while on a cruise to Mexico.
In March 2011, Queen Mary was saluted by  while fireworks were going on, and on 12 March 2013,  made a salute while there were fireworks.

The salute was carried out with Queen Mary replying with her one working air horn in response to Queen Mary 2 sounding her combination of two brand new horns and an original 1934 Queen Mary horn, which is on loan from the City of Long Beach. Queen Mary originally had three whistles tuned to 55 Hz, a frequency chosen because it was low enough that the extremely loud sound of it would not be painful to human ears.

Traditionally, the lower the frequency, the larger the ship. Fifty-five Hz is the "A" note an octave above the lowest note of a standard piano keyboard.

2016 lease to Urban Commons
In 2016, Urban Commons, a real estate company, bought the lease, which extends to 2082, out of default. The lease obligates them to perform the ship’s daily upkeep and long-term projects. Carnival Cruises took over the entire dome and made efficiency improvements under their management. The operator generates funds through its events, the hotel bookings, and passenger fees from the nearby Carnival cruise terminal, which is the largest source. Taxpayer funds were not being used to maintain the ship under the lease agreement. Urban Commons had plans to extensively renovate the liner and to redevelop the adjacent  of parking with a boutique hotel, restaurants, a marina, an amphitheater, jogging trails, bike paths and possibly a huge Ferris wheel, all at a cost of up to $250 million.

In July 2017, while making repairs to a bathroom, workers rediscovered the ship's forward gear room which had once controlled the ship's 16-ton anchors. The room was apparently sealed up during the 1960s conversion and was forgotten for decades.

In May 2019, Urban Commons formed Eagle Hospitality Real Estate Trust with the goal of generating up to $566 million for the Queen Mary along with its portfolio of 12 other hotel properties that it owns or manages. In December it was announced that the city was reviewing the finances of Urban Commons to determine whether the City of Long Beach had "received all revenues owed."

2017 condition

In 2017, a report on the ship's condition was issued. The report observed that not only the hull but also the supports for a raised exhibition area within the ship were corroding and that the ship's deteriorating condition left areas such as the engine room vulnerable to flooding. Repair costs were estimated at close to $300 million. In November 2016 the City of Long Beach had put $23 million toward addressing Queen Marys most vital repairs. John Keisler, economic and property development director for Long Beach, said: "We have a timeline in which the engineers believe they can complete those immediate projects. These are major challenges we can only address over time; it can't all be done at once." Political leaders in Scotland, birthplace of Queen Mary, called for the then UK Prime Minister Theresa May to pressure the American government to fund a full repair of the liner in 2017.

In August 2019, Edward Pribonic, the engineer responsible for inspecting Queen Mary on behalf of the City of Long Beach, issued a report stating that the ship was in the worst condition he had seen in his 25 years on the job. Pribonic stated that the neglect of Queen Mary had grown worse under the management of Urban Commons, and concluded that "without an immediate and very significant infusion of manpower and money, the condition of the ship will likely soon be unsalvageable.” Incidents of recent neglect include the flooding of the Grand Ballroom with sewage after a pipe which was flimsily patched with duct tape burst, significant amounts of standing water in the ship's bilge, and recently applied paint on the ship's funnels already peeling because of the poor way in which it was applied. The pessimistic conclusion of Pribonic was disputed by city officials, who called the warnings "hyperbolic" and pointed to the "significant" work that has already been undertaken towards repairing Queen Mary.

The $23 million apportioned for repairs ran out in 2018, with 19 out of the 27 urgent projects identified by a 2015 marine survey completed as of September 2019. There were significant cost overruns overall, with the cost of fire safety repairs increasing from the original estimate of $200,000 to $5.29 million. Two of the remaining eight issues identified in 2015 are considered "critical" — this includes the removal of the ship's lifeboats, which have rotted and are in danger of collapsing.

In October 2019, the City of Long Beach warned Urban Commons that the company was failing to uphold its commitment to maintain and repair Queen Mary and that it was accordingly in danger of defaulting on its 66-year lease agreement. Urban Commons responded with an updated plan for repairs, including the removal of the lifeboats at a cost of between $5 and $7 million, and new paint work.

2020 closure and reopening
The Queen Mary ceased operations in May 2020, due to the COVID-19 pandemic. As overseer for several corporations that operated the Queen Mary, Eagle Hospitality Trust filed a motion in federal bankruptcy court on 9 March 2021 to auction off its lease. Court filings by the city claimed that Urban Commons’ repair work was incomplete or not performed correctly and would likely have to be redone. Also, the current condition of the vessel was such that significant safety repairs needed to be performed before it could reopen to the public. In court filings, Eagle Hospitality Trust stated that the lease was their most valuable asset. There were no bidders on the lease after all of Eagle's other hotel properties were sold at a bankruptcy court auction. Eagle Hospitality Trust agreed to surrender its lease agreement back to the city, and Long Beach took back control in June 2021. To keep the ship running, the city approved a $2 million, six-month contract with Evolution Hospitality to cover monthly utility fees, security, landscaping and other costs.

An architecture and marine engineering firm hired by the city found that $23 million was needed for urgent safety repairs to keep the ship viable over the next two years. The report by Elliott Bay Design Group reported that the vessel was vulnerable to flooding or possibly even capsizing. On 21 September 2021, the Long Beach City Council voted to turn the Queen Mary and surrounding property over to the Harbor Department. Transfer of the ship and the surrounding land from city control to the port would include Pier H. An urgent removal of the deteriorated lifeboats was completed as they were putting stress on the side shell of the ship which has created cracks in the support system. In June 2022, the city established a new agreement with Evolution Hospitality. By November, the city had spent $2.8 million for plumbing repairs, a new Wi-Fi connection, handrail restoration and energy-efficient lightbulbs. This also included beginning work on the ship’s boilers and heat exchangers. The city approved $1 million to continue repairs to the ship’s linoleum flooring and carpet, refrigerators, elevators, kitchen exhaust hoods, and guest room locks. The ship reopened for limited tours on 15 December 2022.

W6RO

Queen Marys original professionally manned wireless radio room was removed when the ship was moored in Long Beach. In its place, an amateur radio room proposed by Long Beach resident and radio amateur Nate Brightman, K6OSC, was created one deck above the original radio reception room, with some of the discarded original radio equipment used for display purposes. The new Wireless Room was opened for operation on April 22, 1979. The amateur radio station, with the call sign W6RO ("Whiskey Six Romeo Oscar"), relies on volunteers from a local amateur radio club. They staff the radio room during most public hours. The radios can also be used by other licensed amateur radio operators.

In honour of his over forty years of dedication to W6RO and Queen Mary, in November 2007 the Queen Mary Wireless Room was renamed as the Nate Brightman Radio Room. This was announced on 28 October 2007, at Brightman's 90th birthday party by Joseph Prevratil, former President and CEO of Queen Mary.

Haunting legends
 
Following Queen Marys permanent docking in California, claims were made that the ship was haunted. In 2008, Time magazine included the Queen Mary among its "Top 10 Haunted Places". One of the staterooms is alleged to be haunted by the spirit of a person supposedly murdered there. The Queen Mary Hotel promotes suite room B-340, a former third class cabin, as "notoriously haunted". Queen Mary also operates a number of commercial tours that include haunted attraction experiences, such as Dark Harbor, which operates during the Halloween season, the "Haunted Encounters Tour" and "Ghosts and Legends" tour, promoted as featuring "terrifying original stories and characters based on the ship's well-known paranormal tales". Skeptical Inquirer writer John Champion has criticised the haunted tours, calling them a "cynical exploitation of the space" and noting that much effort is put into promoting the ship as a "haunted attraction", while efforts to explain or preserve the factual history of the ship are "somehow pushed to the wayside". Center for Inquiry fellow Joe Nickell attributes the Queen Marys haunting legends to pareidolia, illusory mental images triggered by subjective feelings, and daydreaming states commonly experienced by workers, such as hotel staff, doing repetitive chores. According to skeptic Chris Perley, recordings of "disembodied" voices by ghost hunters are merely ordinary voices being carried through thinly constructed, weight-saving ship walls. Perley began working as a tour guide on the Queen Mary in 2015, and revised the "Haunted Encounters Tour" script to counter various legends and stories with facts drawn from the ship's logs, such as records of documented fatalities. One legend claims that a little girl haunts the first and second class pools, however Perley found that no deaths were recorded in either pool. Another legend is that two daughters murdered by their father in 1959 haunt Room B474 and the surrounding corridors. However, Perley's research revealed the room was originally two Second Class cabins before the ship's conversion in 1967-71, and the murder-suicide actually took place in Roanoke, Virginia in 1964, and not aboard the ship.

References

Further reading
 The Cunard White Star Quadruple-screw North Atlantic Liner, Queen Mary. Bonanza Books, 289 p., 1979. . Largely a reprint of a special edition of The Shipbuilder and Marine Engine-builder from 1936.
 
 Ellery, David, RMS Queen Mary 101 Questions & Answers, Conway, 2006, 
 Ellery, David, RMS Queen Mary : The World's Favourite Liner, Waterfront, 1994, 
 Duncan, William J., RMS Queen Mary: Queen of the Queens, Anderson, South Carolina: Droke House, distr. Grosset & Dunlap, 1969, .
 Cunard Line, Ltd., John Brown and Company archives.
 Clydebank Central Library Clydebank, Scotland.
 Maddocks, Melvin, The Great Liners, 1978, Time-Life Books, Alexandria, Va., 
 McCutcheon, Janette, RMS Queen Mary : transatlantic masterpiece, Tempus, 2000, 
 Roberts, Andrew, Masters and Commanders: How four titans won the war in the West, 1941–1945, Harper Collins e-Books, London
 Grattidge, Harry, Captain of the Queens, Dutton, New York
 Tramp to Queen autobiography by Capt. John Treasure Jones, The History Press (2008) 
 The Queens of the North Atlantic by Robert Lacey, Sidgwick & Jackson (1973)
 RMS Queen Mary. 50 Years of Splendour by David E Hutchings, Kingfisher Productions (1986)
 Three Stacks and You’re Out by Velma Krauch, VanLee Enterprise (1971), an account of the Last Great Voyage by a passenger

External links

 Website of current commercial operator  (Event listings as well as Facts & History section)
 "Thirty Million Dollar Super Liner Is Built", January 1932, Popular Mechanics detailed article on the construction of the future RMS Queen Mary
 The Great Ocean Liners: RMS Queen Mary
 Restored colour archive film of RMS Queen Mary on the Clyde (1936)(archive films from the National Library of Scotland)
Queen Mary Cunard Service History at Chris’ Cunard Page 
 Launch of the Queen Mary (1934) (archive films from the National Library of Scotland)

|-

|-

|-

1934 ships
Art Deco ships
Blue Riband holders
Ships built on the River Clyde
Maritime incidents in October 1942
Museum ships in California
Museums in Long Beach, California
Ocean liners
Passenger ships of the United Kingdom
Reportedly haunted locations in Los Angeles
Rogue wave incidents
Ships of the Cunard Line
Ships on the National Register of Historic Places in California
Steamships
Troop ships of the United Kingdom
Tourist attractions in Long Beach, California
National Register of Historic Places in Los Angeles
Maritime incidents in 1949
Ships and vessels on the National Archive of Historic Vessels